Fraxinus uhdei, commonly known as tropical ash or  Shamel ash, is a species of tree native to Mexico and Central America. It is commonly planted as a street tree in Mexico and the southwestern United States. It has also been planted and spread from cultivation in Hawaii, where it is now considered an invasive species.

Like other species in the section Melioides, Fraxinus uhdei is dioecious, with male and female flowers produced on separate individuals.

Taxonomy
The specific epithet uhdei refers to Carl Uhde, a German plant collector who explored Mexico in the 1840s.

Fraxinus uhdei is locally known as fresno blanco in Spanish; other English vernacular names include Hawaiian ash and Mexican ash. The name Shamel ash refers to Archie Shamel, who introduced the trees to California in the 1920s. It is known as Urapan in Colombia, where it was introduced in the 1950s.

Ecology
A dieback caused by a phytoplasma was recorded in Colombia and Ecuador in 2004.

References

uhdei
Flora of North America
Dioecious plants
Trees of Central America
Trees of Mexico
Flora of the Central American pine–oak forests